Come Back Home may refer to:

 "Come Back Home" (Seo Taiji and Boys song), 1995
 "Come Back Home" (Pete Yorn song), 2003
 "Come Back Home" (2NE1 song), 2014
 "Come Back Home" (Sofia Carson song), 2022
 "Come Back Home", a 2017 remake of Seo Taiji and Boys by BTS
 "Come Back Home", a 2020 song by Oneus
 Come Back Home (film), a 2022 South Korean comedy